Port Orange is a hamlet in Deerpark, Orange County, New York, United States.

References

Hamlets in Orange County, New York